Shaun Michael Graham (born October 6, 1978, in Burley, Idaho) is an American visual effects animator for television and films.

Filmography
Video game

Television

Film

References

External links 
 

1978 births
American animators
Living people
People from Burley, Idaho